Fantastico is a commercial script library that automates the installation of web applications to a website. Fantastico scripts are executed from the administration area of a website control panel such as cPanel. Fantastico's web site claims that they are installed on ten thousand servers, with a million users worldwide.

Fantastico scripts are usually executed when a new website is created, or a new application is added to an existing website. The scripts typically create tables in a database, install software, adjust permissions, and modify web server configuration files. Although Fantastico primarily targets open-source software, a handful of scripts are also available that install proprietary products. Once installed, these are available to all of the domains hosted by a physical server; such as web site builder SohoLaunch, PerlDesk customer support software, and AccountLab Plus software for interacting with Internet registrars.

There are more than 650 applications that have Fantastico scripts associated with them.

See also 
 cPanel – One of the platforms on which Fantastico runs.
 installapp – Script Installer for Kloxo
 Installatron 
 Softaculous

References

External links 
 Fantastico F3 website

Web hosting